Advances in Developing Human Resources is a quarterly peer-reviewed academic journal that covers research on human resources, including areas such as performance, learning, and integrity within an organizational context. The editor-in-chief is Marilyn Y. Byrd (University of Oklahoma). The journal was established in 1999 and is published by SAGE Publications.

Abstracting and indexing
The journal is abstracted and indexed in:
 Business Source Elite
 Business Source Premier
 PsycINFO
 Scopus

External links

SAGE Publishing academic journals
English-language journals
Quarterly journals
Publications established in 1999
Human resource management journals